List of Serb patriotic songs includes poems and songs, both composed for music and literary works, with pronounced patriotic motives and themes.

Reference

Lists of patriotic songs

Songs about Serbia